This is a list of American jazz drummers. Jazz drummers play percussion (predominantly the drum set) in jazz, jazz fusion, and other jazz subgenres such as latin jazz. The techniques and instrumentation of this type of performance have evolved over the 1900s, influenced by jazz at large and the individual drummers within it. Jazz required a method of playing percussion different from traditional European styles, one that was easily adaptable to the different rhythms of the new genre, fostering the creation of jazz drumming's hybrid technique. As each period in the evolution of jazz—swing and bebop, for example—tended to have its own rhythmic style, jazz drumming continued to evolve along with the music. In the 1970s and 1980s, jazz drumming incorporated elements of rock and Latin styles.

American jazz drummers

A

  Clarence Acox, Jr. 
  Leo Adde 
  Henry Adler 
  Pheeroan akLaff 
  Mousey Alexander 
  Muhammad Ali (drummer) 
  Rashied Ali 
  Don Alias 
  Carl Allen (drummer) 
  Barry Altschul 
  Danny Alvin 
  Robby Ameen 
  Scott Amendola 
  Leon Anderson 
  Horace Arnold 
  Joe Ascione 
  Cuba Austin

B

  Dave Bailey (musician) 
  Donald Bailey (musician) 
  Butch Ballard 
  Jeff Ballard (musician) 
  Louis Barbarin 
  Paul Barbarin 
  Danny Barcelona 
  Thurman Barker 
  Joey Baron 
  Ray Barretto 
  Lionel Batiste 
  Bobby Battle 
  Ray Bauduc 
  Ronnie Bedford 
  Poogie Bell 
  Louie Bellson 
  Tommy Benford 
  Jimmy Bennington 
  Black Benny 
  Bill Berg (musician) 
  Dick Berk 
  Steve Berrios 
  Vic Berton 
  Jimmy Bertrand 
  Denzil Best 
  John Betsch 
  Chief Bey 
  Tony Bianco 
  Wallace Bishop 
  Gregg Bissonette 
  Jim Black 
  Cindy Blackman 
  Ed Blackwell 
  John Blackwell (musician) 
  Brian Blade 
  Allen Blairman 
  Art Blakey 
  John G. Blowers, Jr. 
  Mickey Bones 
  Fred Braceful 
  Pauline Braddy 
  Tiny Bradshaw 
  Gerald Brashear 
  Brittany Brooks 
  Cecil Brooks III
  Roy Brooks 
  Anthony Brown (musician) 
  Mel Brown (drummer) 
  Larry Bunker 
  Gary Burghoff 
  Ronnie Burrage 
  Alvin Burroughs 
  Frank Butler (musician)

C

  Gene Calderazzo 
  Charlie Callas 
  Frank Capp 
  Terri Lyne Carrington 
  Michael Carvin 
  Sid Catlett 
  Nick Ceroli 
  Jimmy Chamberlin 
  Dennis Chambers 
  Joe Chambers 
  Leon "Ndugu" Chancler 
  Gary Chester 
  Mike Clark (jazz musician) 
  Kenny Clarke 
  Gerald Cleaver (musician) 
  Alex Cline 
  Jimmy Cobb 
  Billy Cobham 
  Cozy Cole 
  Denardo Coleman 
  Rudy Collins 
  Norman Connors 
  Frank Cook (American musician) 
  Jerome Cooper 
  Keith Copeland 
  Jack Costanzo 
  Irving Cottler 
  Louis Cottrell, Sr. 
  Herbert Cowans 
  Jimmy Crawford (drummer) 
  Adam Cruz 
  Andrew Cyrille

D

  Billie Davies 
  Quincy Davis (musician) 
  Steve Davis (American drummer) 
  Alan Dawson 
  Ike Day 
  Donald Dean 
  Barrett Deems 
  Jack DeJohnette 
  Kenny Dennis 
  Joe DeRenzo 
  Clem DeRosa 
  Michael Di Pasqua 
  Whit Dickey 
  Bruce Ditmas 
  Ben Dixon (musician) 
  Baby Dodds 
  Bobby Donaldson 
  Eddie Dougherty 
  Bill Douglass 
  Bill Dowdy
  Josh Dun
  Hamid Drake 
  Al Dreares 
  Buzzy Drootin 
  Billy Drummond 
  Frankie Dunlop 
  Bobby Durham (jazz musician)

E

  Arthur Edgehill 
  Marc Edwards (drummer) 
  Bill Elgart 
  Atilla Engin 
  Herman "Roscoe" Ernest III 
  Peter Erskine 
  Pete Escovedo 
  Sticks Evans 
  Sue Evans

F

  Joe Farnsworth 
  Nick Fatool 
  Morey Feld 
  Sherman Ferguson 
  Alvin Fielder 
  Kansas Fields 
  Sammy Figueroa 
  Chuck Flores 
  Al Foster 
  Panama Francis 
  Cie Frazier 
  Bruz Freeman 
  Bob French (jazz musician)

G

  Steve Gadd 
  Frank Gagliardi 
  Rich Galichon 
  Joe Gallivan 
  Gene Gammage 
  Frank Gant 
  Alvester Garnett 
  Eddie Gladden 
  Bill Goodwin (jazz drummer) 
  Danny Gottlieb 
  Eric Gravatt 
  Milford Graves 
  Sonny Greer 
  Freddie Gruber 
  Terreon Gully

H

  Omar Hakim 
  Dana Hall (musician) 
  Minor Hall 
  Tubby Hall 
  Chico Hamilton 
  Jeff Hamilton (drummer) 
  Ivan Hampden, Jr. 
  Lionel Hampton 
  Jake Hanna 
  Al Harewood 
  Eric Harland 
  Winard Harper 
  Beaver Harris 
  Billy Hart 
  Roy Harte 
  Louis Hayes 
  Roy Haynes 
  Monk Hazel 
  Fats Heard 
  J. C. Heard 
  Albert Heath 
  Mike Heller 
  Gerry Hemingway 
  Arthur Herbert 
  Phil Hey 
  Billy Higgins 
  Andrew Hilaire 
  Jeff Hirshfield 
  Ari Hoenig 
  G.T. Hogan 
  Milt Holland 
  John Hollenbeck (musician) 
  Bob Holz
  William Hooker (musician) 
  Stix Hooper 
  Jimmy Hopps 
  Frank Hudec 
  Paul Humphrey 
  Lex Humphries 
  Roger Humphries

I
  Susie Ibarra 
  Sonny Igoe 
  Frank Isola

J

  Ali Jackson (musician) 
  Oliver Jackson 
  Ronald Shannon Jackson 
  Pete Jacobs (musician) 
  Sunny Jain 
  Clifford Jarvis 
  Morris Jennings 
  Dink Johnson 
  Gus Johnson (jazz musician) 
  Manzie Johnson 
  Osie Johnson 
  Smokey Johnson 
  Alan Jones (drummer) 
  Elvin Jones 
  Jo Jones 
  Philly Joe Jones 
  Rufus "Speedy" Jones 
  Rusty Jones (musician) 
  Slick Jones 
  Willie Jones, III 
  Steve Jordan (musician) 
  Robert Jospé

K

  Tiny Kahn 
  Connie Kay 
  Sean J. Kennedy 
  Billy Kilson 
  Irv Kluger 
  Freddie Kohlman 
  Gene Krupa 
  Andy Kubiszewski

L

  Joe LaBarbera 
  Papa Jack Laine 
  Don Lamond 
  Vince Lateano 
  Ricky Lawson 
  Bob Leatherbarrow 
  Mark Ledford 
  Cliff Leeman 
  Stan Levey 
  Al Levitt 
  Mel Lewis 
  Victor Lewis 
  Eddie Locke 
  Cecil Brooks III 
  Herbie Lovelle

M

  Dennis Mackrel 
  Peter Magadini 
  Future Man 
  Shelly Manne 
  Ray Mantilla 
  Larance Marable 
  Art Mardigan 
  Sherrie Maricle 
  Jason Marsalis 
  George Marsh (musician) 
  Eddie Marshall 
  Joe Marshall (musician) 
  Kaiser Marshall 
  Billy Martin (percussionist) 
  Stu Martin (drummer) 
  Harvey Mason 
  Steve McCall (drummer) 
  Roy McCurdy 
  Monk McFay 
  Ray McKinley 
  William McKinney 
  Butch Miles 
  J. R. Mitchell 
  Louis Mitchell 
  Charles Moffett 
  John Molo 
  T. S. Monk 
  Stanton Moore 
  Chauncey Morehouse 
  Joe Morello 
  Curtis Mosby 
  Bob Moses (musician) 
  J. C. Moses 
  Paul Motian 
  Alphonse Mouzon 
  Don Moye 
  Idris Muhammad 
  Don Mumford 
  Paul Murphy (musician) 
  Sunny Murray 
  Kris Myers

N
  Lewis Nash 
  Jack Noren 
  Kevin Norton 
  Adam Nussbaum

O
  Grassella Oliphant 
  Ulysses Owens

P

  Leon Parker 
  Sonny Parker (musician) 
  Sonny Payne 
  William Peeples 
  Paul Peress 
  Walter Perkins (musician) 
  Ben Perowsky 
  Charlie Persip 
  Ralph Peterson, Jr. 
  Benny Peyton 
  Dan Pinto 
  Ben Pollack 
  Jeff Porcaro 
  Joe Porcaro 
  Roy Porter (drummer) 
  Yank Porter 
  Specs Powell 
  Ollie Powers 
  Bobby Previte 
  Jesse Price (musician) 
  Dafnis Prieto 
  Tito Puente 
  Bernard Purdie 
  Keg Purnell 
  Maurice Purtill 
  Moe Purtill

Q
  Alvin Queen

R

  Johnny Rae 
  Tom Rainey 
  Paul Ramsey (musician) 
  Sam Ranelli 
  Chuck Redd 
  Tony Reedus 
  William Frank Reichenbach Sr. 
  Damion Reid 
  Steve Reid 
  Steve Reid (musician) 
  Charlie Rice 
  Buddy Rich 
  Emil Richards 
  Dannie Richmond 
  Karriem Riggins 
  Ben Riley 
  Herlin Riley 
  John Bernard Riley 
  Max Roach 
  Gino Robair 
  John Robinson (drummer) 
  David Rokeach 
  Mickey Roker 
  Jay Rosen (drummer) 
  Bobby Rosengarden 
  Tony Royster, Jr. 
  Robert M. Rucker 
  Hal Russell 
  Dylan Ryan (drummer)

S

  Gar Samuelson 
  Bobby Sanabria  
  Juma Santos 
  Red Saunders (musician) 
  Tony Sbarbaro 
  George Schuller 
  Allan Schwartzberg 
  Lafrae Olivia Sci 
  Aaron Scott 
  Kendrick Scott 
  Lloyd Scott (musician) 
  Danny Seraphine 
  Frank Severino 
  Ed Shaughnessy 
  Dinerral Shavers 
  Charles "Bobo" Shaw 
  Kevin Shea (musician) 
  Shep Shepherd 
  Mark Sherman (musician) 
  George T. Simon 
  Pete La Roca 
  Zutty Singleton 
  Matt Slocum (drummer) 
  Ches Smith 
  Jimmie Smith 
  Marvin Smith 
  Michael S. Smith 
  Steve Smith (musician) 
  Warren Smith (jazz percussionist) 
  Ed Soph 
  Bud Spangler 
  Jack Sperling 
  Nick Stabulas 
  Tom Stacks 
  George Stafford 
  Johnny Stein 
  Bill Stewart (musician) 
  Isaiah Stewart (drummer) 
  Alvin Stoller

T

  Grady Tate 
  Art Taylor 
  Jasper Taylor 
  Brannen Temple 
  Ben Thigpen 
  Ed Thigpen 
  Bobby Thomas 
  Chester Thompson 
  Kimberly Thompson 
  Cal Tjader 
  Dave Tough 
  Arthur Trappier 
  Milt Turner 
  Chris Tyle

U
  Sam Ulano

V
  Tony Vacca 
  Vinson Valega 
  Tommy Vig 
  Bill Vitt 
  John Von Ohlen

W

  Chad Wackerman 
  Luigi Waites 
  Freddie Waits 
  Skoota Warner 
  Kenny Washington (musician) 
  Leo Watson 
  Jeff "Tain" Watts 
  Chick Webb 
  Speed Webb 
  Spider Webb (jazz drummer) 
  Dave Weckl 
  Paul Wertico 
  Doc West 
  George Wettling 
  Chip White 
  Lenny White 
  Al "Cake" Wichard 
  Buddy Williams (jazz drummer) 
  Jeff Williams (musician) 
  Johnny Williams (drummer) 
  Leroy Williams 
  Steve Williams (jazz drummer) 
  Tony Williams (drummer) 
  Phillip Wilson (drummer) 
  Shadow Wilson 
  Kenny Wollesen 
  Sam Woodyard 
  Specs Wright

Y
  Lee Young

Z
  Kahil El'Zabar 
  Eliot Zigmund

See also

 List of jazz bassists
 List of jazz clarinetists
 List of jazz drummers
 List of jazz guitarists
 List of jazz organists
 List of jazz percussionists
 List of jazz pianists
 List of jazz saxophonists
 List of jazz trombonists
 List of jazz trumpeters
 List of jazz violinists
 List of jazz vocalists

References

American jazz drummers
Lists of American musicians